Daniele Secci (born 9 March 1992) is an Italian shot putter.

Biography
He won a silver medal at the 2011 European Athletics Junior Championships, behind Youth Olympic champion Krzysztof Brzozowski.

National titles
Daniele Secci has won 2 time the individual national championship.
1 win in the shot put outdoor (2014)
1 win in the shot put indoor (2014)

References

External links
 

1992 births
Living people
Athletics competitors of Fiamme Gialle
Italian male shot putters